The men's sprint (track cycling) at the 1992 Summer Olympics (Cycling) was an event that consisted of cyclists making three laps around the track. Only the time for the last 200 metres of the 750 metres covered was counted as official time. The races were held on Tuesday, July 28, Wednesday, July 29, Thursday, July 30 and Friday, July 31, 1992, at the Velòdrom d'Horta. There were 23 competitors from 23 nations, with each nation limited to one cyclist. The event was won by Jens Fiedler of Germany, the first victory in the men's sprint for Germany as a unified nation since 1936 (though East Germany had won two gold medals since). Gary Neiwand of Australia took silver, the third time that nation had a runner-up in the event; Neiwand was only the fourth man to win multiple medals in the sprint (adding to his 1988 bronze). Canada earned its first medal in the men's sprint with Curt Harnett's bronze.

Background

This was the 20th appearance of the event, which has been held at every Summer Olympics except 1904 and 1912. Four of the quarterfinalists from 1988 returned: silver medalist Nikolai Kovsh of the Soviet Union (now representing the Unified Team), bronze medalist Gary Neiwand of Australia, sixth-place finisher Erik Schoefs of Belgium, and eighth-place finisher Maxwell Cheeseman of Trinidad and Tobago. East Germany had been dominant through reunification of Germany; Bill Huck and Jens Fiedler had won the last three world championships, and the last time anyone not from East Germany had won was 1982. With only one cyclist per nation allowed, Fiedler was selected for the German team and was the heavy favorite.

Indonesia made its debut in the men's sprint; some former Soviet republics competed as the Unified Team. France made its 20th appearance, the only nation to have competed at every appearance of the event.

Competition format

This sprint competition involved a series of head-to-head matches along with the new qualifying round of time trials. There were five main match rounds, with two repechages. The first repechage had two rounds.

 Qualifying round: Each of the 23 competitors completed a 200-metre flying time trial (reaching full speed before timing started for the last 200 metres). The top 24 advanced to the match rounds, seeded based on their time in the qualifying round. With only 23 riders starting, nobody was eliminated.
 Round 1: The 23 cyclists were seeded into 8 heats of 3 cyclists each, except that one heat had only 2 cyclists and a second was reduced to 2 by a withdrawal. The winner of each heat advanced to the 1/8 finals (8 cyclists) while the other cyclists went to the first repechage semifinals (14 cyclists).
 First repechage semifinals: The 14 cyclists were divided into 7 heats, each with 2 cyclists. The winner of each heat advanced to the first repechage finals (7 cyclists) while the losers were eliminated (7 cyclists).
 First repechage finals: The 7 cyclists were divided into 3 heats, two with 2 cyclists and one with 3 cyclists. The winners of each heat advanced to the 1/8 finals, along with the second-placed cyclist in the heat of 3 (4 cyclists). The last-place cyclist in each heat was eliminated (3 cyclists).
 1/8 finals: The 12 remaining cyclists competed in a 1/8 finals round. There were 4 heats in this round, with 3 cyclists in each. The top cyclist in each heat advanced to the quarterfinals (4 cyclists), while the remaining two in each heat went to the second repechage (8 cyclists).
 Second repechage: This round featured 4 heats, with 2 cyclists each. The winner of each heat advanced to the quarterfinals (4 cyclists); the losers were eliminated (4 cyclists).
 Quarterfinals: Beginning with the quarterfinals, all matches were one-on-one competitions and were held in best-of-three format. There were 4 quarterfinals, with the winner of each advancing to the semifinals and the loser going to the fifth-eighth classification race.
 Semifinals: The two semifinals provided for advancement to the gold medal final for winners and to the bronze medal final for losers.
 Finals: Both a gold medal final and a bronze medal final were held, as well as a classification final for fifth through eighth places for quarterfinal losers.

Records

The records for the sprint are 200 metre flying time trial records, kept for the qualifying round in later Games as well as for the finish of races.

Three men broke the Olympic record in the qualifying round, in sequence: Curt Harnett clocked in at 10.368 seconds, Gary Neiwand at 10.330 seconds, and Jens Fiedler at 10.252 seconds.

Schedule

All times are Central European Summer Time (UTC+2)

Results

Qualifying round

Held Tuesday, July 28. 
Times and average speeds are listed.

Round 1

Held Tuesday, July 28. The 1/16 round consisted of eight heats, seven of three riders and one of two riders. Winners advanced to the next round, losers competed in the repechage.

Heat 1

Heat 2

Heat 3

Heat 4

Heat 5

Heat 6

Heat 7

Heat 8

First repechage semifinals

Held Tuesday, July 28. The fourteen defeated cyclists from the first round took part in the 1/16 repechage. They raced in seven heats of two riders each. The winner of each heat advance to repechage finals.

First repechage semifinal 1

First repechage semifinal 2

First repechage semifinal 3

First repechage semifinal 4

First repechage semifinal 5

First repechage semifinal 6

First repechage semifinal 7

First repechage finals

Held Tuesday, July 28. The seven winning cyclists from the second round repechage took part in the final repechage. They raced in two heats of two riders and one heat of three riders. The winner of the first two heats and the top two from heat three advanced to the next round .

First repechage final 1

First repechage final 2

First repechage final 3

1/8 finals

Held Wednesday, July 29. The 1/8 finals consisted of four heats of three riders each. The winners of each heat advance to the next round, with losers getting another chance in the third round repechage.

1/8 final 1

1/8 final 2

1/8 final 3

1/8 final 4

Second repechage

Held Wednesday, July 29. The eight cyclists defeated in the third round competed in the third round repechage. Four heats of two riders were held. Winners rejoined the victors from the third round and advanced to the quarterfinals.

Second repechage heat 1

Second repechage heat 2

Second repechage heat 3

Second repechage heat 4

Quarterfinals

Held Wednesday, July 29. The eight riders that had advanced to the quarterfinals competed pairwise in four matches. Each match consisted of two races, with a potential third race being used as a tie-breaker if each cyclist won one of the first two races. All four quarterfinals matches were decided without a third race. Winners advanced to the semifinals, losers competed in a 5th to 8th place classification.

Quarterfinal 1

Quarterfinal 2

Quarterfinal 3

Quarterfinal 4

Semifinals

Held Thursday, July 30. The four riders that had advanced to the semifinals competed pairwise in two matches. Each match consisted of two races, with a potential third race being used as a tie-breaker if each cyclist won one of the first two races. Winners advanced to the finals, losers competed in the bronze medal match.

Semifinal 1

Semifinal 2

Finals

Held Friday, July 31.

Classification 5-8

Held Friday, July 31. The 5-8 classification was a single race with all four riders that had lost in the quarterfinals taking place. The winner of the race received 5th place, with the others taking the three following places in order.

Bronze medal match

The bronze medal match was contested in a set of three races, with the winner of two races declared the winner.

Gold medal match

The gold medal match was contested in a set of three races, with the winner of two races declared the winner.

Final classification

References

External links
Official Olympic Report

M
Cycling at the Summer Olympics – Men's sprint
Track cycling at the 1992 Summer Olympics
Men's events at the 1992 Summer Olympics